Emilio Pérez Touriño (born 8 August 1948) is a Spanish politician and economist. He is the former secretary general of the Socialists' Party of Galicia and, from August 2005 to March 2009, former president of the autonomous community of Galicia (Spain). Namely, he was president of the executive branch, the Xunta de Galicia. His political views are social democratic and Galicianist.

Academic studies
An economist by profession, Pérez Touriño completed a course of specialisation at the University of Grenoble (France). He finished his doctoral degree in economics at the University of Santiago de Compostela. He was also vice-president for financial affairs in that same university. During his university years, Touriño developed an intense academic activity, teaching and publishing a number of works on economy and development. He would frequently use Galicia and Galicia's infrastructures as a case study in the integration with the European Union.

Politics
During the transition to democracy (1975–1982), following the end of Francoist Spain, Touriño rebranded himself as a left wing political activist and even participated in the drafting of the Galician Statute of Autonomy of 1981. He joined the cabinet of minister Abel Caballero at the Spanish ministry for transportation, tourism and communications. He also worked in a senior position at the ministry for public works, transportation and the environment. In 1994, he was accused of having accepted irregular payments and as a result renounced to all his political posts and returned to academia. That same year he also received the Spanish Great Cross of Civil Merit. He eventually returned to politics in 1996 when he was elected to the Spanish Congress representing A Coruña Province though he resigned from Congress in 1997.

In 1998, Touriño replaced Francisco Vázquez as general secretary of the Socialists' Party of Galicia. In 2005 he became the president of Galicia, defeating Manuel Fraga's People's Party of Galicia, thanks to a coalition government established with the Galician Nationalist Bloc. Subsequently, both coalition parties were engaged by the Spanish Prime Minister, José Luis Rodríguez Zapatero, in reviewing the current Statute of Autonomy, in order to renegotiate the status of Galicia as a part of the Spanish State. He was re-elected secretary general of the Socialists' Party of Galicia in July 2008.

In the elections of 2009, his government was ousted by Alberto Núñez Feijóo of the PP.

Academic publications (selection)
 _ (1982): "A Evolución da agricultura no capitalismo: a concepción dos clásicos do marxismo como paradigma dunha visión determinista do desenvolvemento histórico", in Revista galega de estudios agrarios, no. 6, p. 183–207.
 _ (1983): Agricultura y capitalismo: análisis de la pequeña producción campesina. Ministerio de Agricultura, Pesca y Alimentación, Servicio de Publicaciones Agrarias, Madrid.
 _ (1992): "Las infraestructuras como factor de despegue del desarrollo gallego", in Estructura económica de Galicia, González Laxe [dir]. Espasa Calpe, Madrid, p. 429–488.
 _ et al. (1997): Infraestructuras y desarrollo regional: efectos económicos de la autopista del Atlántico. Civitas, Madrid.
 _ et al. (1998): Los Efectos económicos de las autovías de Galicia. Instituto de Estudios Económicos de Galicia Pedro Barrié de la Maza, A Coruña.
 _ (2001): En clave de país. Santa Comba, A Coruña.
 _ (2001): "Eurorrexión Galicia-Norte de Portugal, unha oportunidade e un reto", in Tempo exterior, no. 3, p. 17–22.

See also
Xunta de Galicia
Parliament of Galicia
Galician Statute of Autonomy of 1981
Socialists' Party of Galicia
Spanish Socialist Workers' Party

References 
 Emilio Pérez Touriño official biography at Xunta de Galicia website. Access date 26 September 2008
 Profile of Pérez Touriño, published by the newspaper El País in June 2005. Access date 26 September 2008

Notes

|-

1948 births
Living people
People from A Coruña
Presidents of the Regional Government of Galicia
Politicians from Galicia (Spain)
Spanish Socialist Workers' Party politicians
Members of the 6th Parliament of Galicia
Members of the 7th Parliament of Galicia
Members of the 8th Parliament of Galicia